Kentucky Route 401 (KY 401) is a  state highway in the U.S. state of Kentucky. The highway travels through mostly rural areas of Breckinridge County.

Route description
KY 401 begins at an intersection with KY 259 (Leitchfield Road) in Madrid, within the southeastern part of Breckinridge County. It travels to the northeast and travels through Centerview. After intersecting the western terminus of KY 84 (Hardin Springs Road), it curves to the north-northeast and travels through Hudson. The highway heads to the east-northeast and curves to the northeast. It travels through Constantine and curves to the north-northeast before meeting its eastern terminus, an intersection with KY 86, in Dyer.

Major intersections

See also

References

0401
Transportation in Breckinridge County, Kentucky